St. George's Grammar School is a private school located at Abids, Hyderabad. It is affiliated to the Council for the Indian School Certificate Examinations.

History
The school was established in 1834, named Hyderabad Residency School, to cater for the educational needs of the children of the British community serving the government in Hyderabad. It is the oldest English medium school of the city and one of the oldest in India. In 1867 the school changed its name to The Chudderghat Protestant School, and in 1891 to St.George's Grammar School. In 1865 a separate girls' school was established, the first in Hyderabad.

Notable alumni
 Ali Nawaz Jung Bahadur
 Syed Abid Ali, cricketer
Mirza Hameeduallah Beg
Hasan Gafoor
Abid Hasan
 Idris Hasan Latif
 Sarojini Naidu
Suresh Oberoi
 K. T. Rama Rao
 Rakesh Sharma
Vinai Thummalapalli

Notable alumni
 Malik Shahbaaz Khan

See also
 Church of South India
 List of schools in India

References

Church of South India schools
Christian schools in Telangana
Heritage structures in Hyderabad, India
Private schools in Hyderabad, India
Educational institutions established in 1834
1834 establishments in India
High schools and secondary schools in Hyderabad, India